Stan van den Elzen (born 27 May 2000) is a Dutch professional basketball player for ZZ Leiden of the BNXT League.

Career
Rosmalen was born in Rosmalen and played for his local team The Black Eagles during his youth years. Then, he moved to the academy of Heroes Den Bosch.

In the 2016–17 season, Van den Elzen made his debut with Heroes Den Bosch in the Dutch Basketball League (DBL) after playing four years with the youth section of the club. 

On 5 August 2020, Van den Elzen signed with Den Helder Suns. After a successful season with Den Helder, he won the DBL Most Improved Player award.

On 23 January 2022, van den Elzen scored a career-high 35 points in an overtime loss against Landstede Hammers. He averaged a career best 14.0 points, 2.8 rebounds and 2.9 assists per game in the 2021–22 season.

On 16 June 2022, he signed a 2-year contract with ZZ Leiden. On 12 March 2023, he won the Dutch Basketball Cup with Leiden after defeating Landstede Hammers in the final.

National team career
Van den Elzen played for the  U16, U18 and U20 teams. With U18, he won gold at the 2018 FIBA Europe Under-18 Championship Division B.

References

External links
 Stan van den Elzen on RealGM

2000 births
Living people
Den Helder Suns players
Dutch Basketball League players
Dutch men's basketball players
Heroes Den Bosch players
Shooting guards
People from Rosmalen
Sportspeople from North Brabant
ZZ Leiden players